The 1929 New Hampshire Wildcats football team was an American football team that represented the University of New Hampshire as a member of the New England Conference during the 1929 college football season. In its 14th season under head coach William "Butch" Cowell, the team compiled a 7–2 record, and outscored their opponents, 162–78. The team played its home games in Durham, New Hampshire, at Memorial Field.

Schedule

Notes

References

New Hampshire
New Hampshire Wildcats football seasons
New Hampshire Wildcats football